Flabellipecten flabelliformis is an extinct species of large scallop or saltwater clam, marine bivalve mollusks in the family Pectinidae, the scallops.

Description

Distribution
Fossils of this species can be found in the Pleistocene - Pliocene marine strata of Greece, Romania, Italy, Cyprus, Hungary and Ukraine.

References
Gwannon
Natural History Museum Rotterdam
Paleontología del Neógeno de la Cuenca del Guadalquivir (Andalucía, España

Pectinidae
Bivalves described in 1814